Luke Anthony "Jocko" Johnson (born 11 March 1981) is an English rock musician, drummer and songwriter. He is most commonly known as 'Jocko'. Johnson began his music career in the late 1990s drumming for a spree of small local West Midlands- punk and metal bands. In early 2003 Johnson was approached by California punk band Amen to join the ranks. After his departure from Amen in 2005, Johnson formed Beat Union as drummer and songwriter with Dave Warsop, Dean Ashton and Mark Andrews. Johnson joined the Welsh alternative metal band Lostprophets in 2009 until their disbanding in 2013. Johnson has also been involved in other musical projects, including working alongside Producer John Feldmann (Good Charlotte, The Used, Kelly Clarkson) and has performed session work for a variety of bands, including The Wonder Stuff and Foxy Shazam.

Biography

Early life
Johnson was exposed to music at the very early age of 2. Beginning with his father, Les Johnson, who was a Birmingham promoter for such bands as New Order, Killing Joke and New Model Army.
At the age of 5, Johnson started to join his father on tour with the band he managed The Wonder Stuff.  Johnson was then given his first pair of drumsticks by Martin Gilks and would often even get to soundcheck the drums. '"All my life I've been around music. I'd go to shows and soundcheck the drums for the Wonder Stuff and get to play kits on these big stages during soundcheck and hearing the sound of a drumkit through a PA I thought, 'Man I really want to do this!'"', says Johnson. With the support of his parents, at the age of 6, Johnson started taking drum lessons.

Beat Union
Beat Union was a pop-punk band from Birmingham, Bromsgrove and Redditch. They were formerly known as Shortcut to Newark. The group has garnered comparisons to Elvis Costello and The Jam, as well as pop punk groups like Green Day.
In 2006 the band toured the UK with Bedouin Soundclash and Zox. Their debut full-length album, Disconnected, was released on Science Records in April 2008. It was produced with the help of John Feldmann, producer and frontman of Goldfinger. Rolling Stone named their song "She Is the Gun" Song of the Day on 17 July 2008. The song also received rotation on BBC Radio 1, where it rose to No. 5 on the station's airplay charts.
After releasing the album, the group toured with Goldfinger and then played the 2008 Warped Tour in the U.S. A U.S. fall tour was announced with Flogging Molly, followed by UK dates with Less Than Jake.

Lostprophets (2009–2013)
Following the departure of American drummer Ilan Rubin from Lostprophets, Johnson was officially announced as the band's new drummer in August 2009, after they had completed the recording of their fourth studio album The Betrayed. The album was released in January 2010, and Johnson toured with them in support of the album, commencing in February 2010 with their UK tour in which they were supported by Kids in Glass Houses, Hexes, We Are the Ocean and Sharks. Johnson would go on to play on the band's fifth and final album, Weapons, which was released in 2012.
The band split in October 2013 after vocalist Ian Watkins was charged with multiple child sex offences, and then jailed for 29 years.

No Devotion (2014–2015)

Johnson is currently writing music for various artists while also working on his own solo EP. He was also the drummer and founding member of the new rock band formed by former Lostprophets members, No Devotion, after Watkins' imprisonment.

He left No Devotion in late 2014, feeling he would be unable to fulfill full commitments to the band, although it was not announced by the band until January 2015, as the other members hoped he would change his mind. He was replaced by former Kids in Glass Houses drummer Phillip Jenkins as their touring drummer.

Solo Career (2015)

In April 2015, Johnson released three singles on the music streaming service SoundCloud, titled 'Say Something', 'The Beat of my Heart', and 'Ignorance'.

Lowlives (2016–present)
Luke started the band Lowlives in 2016 along with Lee Villain (formerly known as Stitch D of The Defiled), their first show was supporting Moose Blood in Los Angeles in October 2017. Lowlives released their first EP Burn Forever in August 2018 they also supported The Used in the same month in England.

Equipment

Drum Kit
Tama Starclassic Performer Bubinga/Birch
Shell Color: Black Diamond Dust & Chrome Hardware
18'"x22" Kick Drum
6"x14" Starphonic Brass Snare Drum
10"x14" Rack Tom
16"x16" Floor Tom
16"x18" Floor Tom
Iron Cobra Powerglide Twin Pedal

Cymbals
Zildjian
19" A Custom Crash
20" Medium Crash
20" A Custom Crash
20" A Custom Rezo Crash
21" Sweet Ride
15" Mastersound Hi Hats

Drum Sticks
Promark
Pro-mark 2B Nylon Tip Natural Sticks

Drum Heads
Remo
Remo Coated Emperor Tom Heads
Remo Emperor X Snare Head

References

Living people
1981 births
People from Redditch
English rock drummers
English songwriters
Lostprophets members
No Devotion members 
21st-century drummers